The John Sweek House, also originally known as Meadowbrook, is a historic residence in Tualatin, Oregon, United States. Construction began in 1858 for John Sweek, who donated the land for Tualatin's original townsite. While the house is named after Sweek, his wife Maria managed the construction; Sweek had been off in Idaho for six years.

The house was listed on the National Register of Historic Places in 1974.

See also
National Register of Historic Places listings in Washington County, Oregon

References

External links

John Sweek House at University of Oregon Libraries

Tualatin, Oregon
Houses on the National Register of Historic Places in Oregon
National Register of Historic Places in Washington County, Oregon
Houses in Washington County, Oregon
1858 establishments in Oregon Territory